"Aboki" (Hausa: "Friend") is a song by Nigerian rapper Ice Prince. It was released on 28 August 2012, serving as the lead single from his second studio album, Fire of Zamani (2013). The song was produced by Chopstix and released along with "More". It peaked at number 92 on Afribiz's Top 100 chart.

Meaning

According to Nigerian Sounds, "Aboki" translates to friend in Hausa; the song celebrates some of the most successful people from Northern Nigeria. Commenting on the single, Ice Prince said, "I'm absolutely excited about my new project; I feel it shows my fans a different side to me. My whole approach to the music, the delivery, my thought process is different from how it was last year."

Music video

The music video for "Aboki" was released onto YouTube on 1 October 2012, at a total length of 3 minutes and 42 seconds. It was directed by Phil Lee in Los Angeles. During the video shoot, Ice Prince was interviewed by one of his associates. Prior to releasing the music video, he uploaded a behind the scenes video of the interview onto YouTube. In the video, Ice Prince talked about the meaning of Aboki and the overall message of his music.

Accolades

"Aboki" was nominated for Most Gifted African West Video and Most Gifted Video of the Year at the 10th Annual Channel O Music Video Awards, which took place at the Walter Sisulu Square, in Kliptown, Soweto on 30 November 2013. Moreover, the music video was nominated for Best African Act Video at the 5th edition of the 4Syte TV Music Video Awards, held at the Accra International Conference Centre on 16 November 2013.

Live performances

Ice Prince performed the song at the 2012 edition of the Koko Concert. He also performed the song at the finale of Big Brother Africa 8 on 25 August 2013. Moreover, he performed the song at the 2013 Star Trek concert in Nigeria. Furthermore, he performed the song during his tour of North America, and visit to Zambia on Easter Weekend in 2013.

Track listing

 Digital single

Aboki (Remix)

On 25 January 2013, Chocolate City released the alternative version of "Aboki". It features Sarkodie, Mercy Johnson, Wizkid, M.I, and Khuli Chana. The song was originally intended to be included on Ice Prince's second studio album Fire of Zamani (2013), but was ultimately removed from the final track-listing due to reasons that haven't been made public.

Background 
In an interview with Toolz on NdaniTV's The Juice, Ice Prince described the song as the "biggest African collision ever". When asked about his decision to feature Mercy Johnson, he said, "When Sarkodie sent me the verse, he had a line that said 'Mercy Johnson, will you be my Wifey?' He wanted me to say 'Oh no Charly, she's married' and then he says 'okay, I see' and then continues his rap. For me to do it wouldn't have made sense, you know what I mean. I hit up Mercy Johnson...She sent me a voice note and I put it there." Ice Prince also said he had plans to shoot the music video for the remix. However, the music video was never shot.

Promotion
Ice Prince took to Twitter to announce that he would be featuring Mercy Johnson along with the aforementioned recording artists. Charles Mgbolu of Vanguard said that "Fans were anxious to listen to this remix not because of any doubt in the talent of Ice Prince to put together a solid collaboration; rather expectations peaked because Mercy Johnson was in the picture."

Critical reception
Upon its release, the song was met with mixed reviews from music critics. Super Q of 360 Nobs said, "Ice Prince comes alive with the power house remix to the northern flavoured song – Aboki he released last year. He brings together Sarkodie, Mercy Johnson, Wizkid, MI & Khuli Chana to spice the already hawt song up!" Charles Mgbolu of Vanguard also said, "No doubt, many have hailed this song; calling it a powerful collaboration of the masters of minds. Wizkid, Sakodie, MI, Khuli Chana and of course Ice Prince spat fast paced words that would leave anyone trying to catch up mentally dizzy. It's a hot baked collaboration that further deepened Aboki's intensity and overall quality."

On the contrary, those who opposed the song felt Mercy Johnson's involvement in the song was unnecessary; they also thought she was being used as a mere stunt to add publicity to the song.

Track listing
 Digital single

References

2012 songs
2012 singles
Ice Prince songs
Wizkid songs
M.I songs